Wilfried Schmickler (born 28 November 1954 in ) is a German comedian and cabaret artist.

Life 
Schmickler works as a comedian in Germany on TV-shows, in radio and on theatre stages. His programme consist of political cabaret.

Solo programmes by Schmickler 

 Aufhören! (2004)
 Danke! (2005)
 Zum Dritten (2007)
 Es war nicht alles schlecht (2009)
 Weiter (2010)
 Ich weiss es doch auch nicht (2012)

Awards 

 2001 – Deutscher Kleinkunstpreis together with 3-Gestirn
 2007 – Prix Pantheon, special award Reif & Bekloppt
 2007 – Deutscher Kabarettpreis
 2009 – Deutscher Kleinkunstpreis, Sparte Kabarett
 2010 – Salzburger Stier

External links 
 
Website by Wilfried Schmickler
Portrait and Audiopodcast at koeln-magazin.info
Wilfried Schmicklers Hörfunkglosse at WDR 2

References 

German male comedians
German satirists
Kabarettists
German cabaret performers
People from Leverkusen
1954 births
Living people